Henequeneros, of Matanzas won the ninth Cuban National Series, edging Mineros over the 66 game schedule. Industriales had its worst finish to date, ending up fourth of 12 teams.

Standings

References

 (Note - text is printed in a white font on a white background, depending on browser used.)

Cuban National Series seasons
Cuban National Series
1969 in Cuban sport
1970 in Cuban sport